Lao National Television (officially abbreviated as LNTV) is the national television station of the country of Laos. It is divided into 2 television channels, LNTV1 and LNTV3. The network's logo is based on the national symbol – Pha That Luang.

Channels

See also
 Lao National Radio, an organization that was once affiliated with this television station.
 List of television stations in Southeast Asia#Laos

References

External links
 Official website

Television in Laos
Television channels and stations established in 1983
1983 establishments in Laos